The canton of Gueugnon is an administrative division of the Saône-et-Loire department, eastern France. Its borders were modified at the French canton reorganisation which came into effect in March 2015. Its seat is in Gueugnon.

It consists of the following communes:
 
La Chapelle-au-Mans
Chassy
Clessy
Cressy-sur-Somme
Curdin
Cuzy
Dompierre-sous-Sanvignes
Grury
Gueugnon
Issy-l'Évêque
Marly-sous-Issy
Marly-sur-Arroux
Montmort
Neuvy-Grandchamp
Rigny-sur-Arroux
Sainte-Radegonde
Saint-Romain-sous-Versigny
Toulon-sur-Arroux
Uxeau
Vendenesse-sur-Arroux

References

Cantons of Saône-et-Loire